Blue panicgrass is a common name for several plants and may refer to:

Panicum antidotale, native to India and Pakistan
Panicum coloratum, native to Africa